The  is a two-lane national expressway in Tokachi Subprefecture and Okhotsk Subprefecture, Hokkaido, Japan. As of December 2018, the expressway is under construction to connect to link to the Kitami Route of the Dōtō Expressway in Ashoro. As of December 2018, it connects Rikubetsu to Kitami, the most populous city in Okhotsk Subprefecture, on the Sea of Okhotsk coast. It is owned and operated by Ministry of Land, Infrastructure, Transport and Tourism and is signed as E61 under their "2016 Proposal for Realization of Expressway Numbering."

History
Later that year on 24 December, Kitami-chūō and Kitami-kitagami interchanges were added along the section that opened in March.

Future
The Tokachi-Okhotsk Expressway is planned to have a total length of approximately  upon completion.

Junction list
The entire expressway is in Hokkaido.
|colspan="8" style="text-align: center;"|Through to

See also
Dōtō Expressway

References

External links

Expressways in Japan
Roads in Hokkaido